Three Forks, Kentucky, may refer to:

 Park City, Kentucky, an incorporated city in Barren Co. formerly known as Three Forks
 Three Forks, Warren County, Kentucky, an unincorporated community
 Saint Helens, Kentucky, an unincorporated community in Lee Co. also known as Three Forks